The Honeybee Stakes is a Grade III American Thoroughbred horse race for three-year-old fillies at a distance of one and one-sixteenth miles on the dirt run annually in late February or early March at Oaklawn Park Race Track in Hot Springs, Arkansas.  The event currently offers a purse of $300,000.

History
The inaugural running of the event was on 1 April 1988 and was won by the US Hall of Fame trained D. Wayne Lukas and ridden by US Hall of Fame jockey José A. Santos, Lost Kitty who defeated the 1987 US Champion Two-Year-Old Filly Epitome by  lengths in a time of 1:43. D. Wayne Lukas continued his streak in this event training the first four winners.

The event was upgraded to Grade III status in 1990. In 2003, it was downgraded to listed status and held this status until 2008 when it was reclassified as Grade III

The 2008 winner Eight Belles won the event as a short 3/5 odds-on favorite. Later that spring Eight Belles would be tragically euthanized after finishing second in the 2008 Kentucky Derby.

The 2020 winner Shedaresthedevil continued her good form to win the Kentucky Oaks.

The event is part of Road to the Kentucky Oaks.

Records
Speed record:
 1:42.61 - It Tiz Well (2017)

Margins:
 10 lengths   –	Imaginary Lady (1989)

Most wins by a jockey:
 3 - Donald Pettinger (2002, 2003, 2004)

Most wins by a trainer:
 6 - D. Wayne Lukas (1988, 1989, 1990, 1991, 2007, 2022)

Most wins by an owner:
 3 - Fox Hill Farms, Inc. (2005, 2008, 2011)

Winners

Notes:

† Sugar Shock, was first past the post but was disqualified from her neck victory for lugging out and impeding runner-up Euphrosyne a furlong from the wire and placed second.

See also
List of American and Canadian Graded races

External sites
Oaklawn Park Media Guide 2021

References

1988 establishments in Arkansas
Horse races in Arkansas
Oaklawn Park
Flat horse races for three-year-old fillies
Graded stakes races in the United States
Recurring sporting events established in 1988
Grade 3 stakes races in the United States